

The following is a complete list of school districts in the State of Wyoming.

See also
List of high schools in Wyoming
Wyoming Department of Education

References
 Wyoming Department of Education School Calendar 2007-2008, retrieved 2008-05-08

 
School districts
Wyoming
School districts